William Michael O'Neill (born May 6, 1947) is an American lawyer, judge and political figure. He was elected to the Ohio Supreme Court in 2012, for a term beginning January 2013. He served as an appellate judge on the Ohio Eleventh District Court of Appeals for 10 years. He announced on October 29, 2017, as a candidate for Ohio Governor in the 2018 election. On December 8, 2017, he announced he would resign from the Supreme Court on January 26, 2018.

Education and military service
O'Neill graduated from  Cleveland Heights High School in 1965 and Ohio University in 1969, at which point he joined the U.S. Army. He earned the Bronze Star in Vietnam and retired from the military in 2001 as a lieutenant colonel in the Ohio National Guard. With the help of the G.I. Bill, O'Neill graduated from the Cleveland State University College of Law in 1980. He also graduated from Huron School of Nursing as a registered nurse.

Political campaigns

1996 Ohio Court of Appeals campaign
In 1996, O'Neill won a seat on the Ohio Eleventh District Court of Appeals with about 50% of the vote. He served from 1997 to 2007, when he resigned to run for Congress.

2004 Ohio Supreme Court campaign
In a 2004 special election to finish the term of an Ohio Supreme Court justice who resigned, O'Neill lost to Terrence O'Donnell by 21%.

2006 Ohio Supreme Court campaign
In 2006, O'Neill ran against O'Donnell again for a full-term on the Ohio Supreme Court. O'Neill lost again, by over 17%.

2008 Congressional campaign

O'Neill lost in his 2008 bid for Ohio's 14th congressional district seat to incumbent Steve LaTourette by nearly 20%.

Race ranking and details from CQ Politics
Campaign contributions from OpenSecrets

2010 congressional campaign

On February 6, 2010, O'Neill announced that he would be running again as the Democratic nominee for  against LaTourette. O'Neill stated during his campaign his desire to expand the Greater Cleveland Rapid Transit rail system. O'Neill lost the election by over 33%.

2012 Ohio Supreme Court campaign
In 2012, for the third time, O'Neill ran for the Ohio Supreme Court. He won a two-way primary against Fanon Rucker, a judge on the Hamilton County Municipal Court. O'Neill received 72% of the vote and carried all but one of Ohio's 88 counties. In the general election, O'Neill defeated incumbent Robert Cupp by four percent.  O'Neill ran on a budget of just $4000 from his personal funds, a campaign he called "no money from nobody" and that was highlighted in a You Tube video with his twin sons.

2018 Ohio gubernatorial campaign

On October 29, 2017, O'Neill announced that he would join the Democratic primary for Ohio governor. During his announcement, he laid out a platform of minimum wage increases, tax incentives for solar power, mental health care expansion and marijuana legalization in Ohio. Less than a week later he announced that he will recuse himself from new Supreme Court cases and will resign by the February 7, filing deadline due to potential ethical conflicts.

Controversy
On November 17, 2017, O'Neill stirred controversy by posting on Facebook regarding allegations of sexual assault against U.S. Senator Al Franken. He referred to those calling for Franken to resign as "dogs of war" and decried a "national feeding frenzy" against age-old sexual indiscretions. O'Neill went on to claim that he had been in sexual relationships with approximately fifty women. In response to these posts, his communications director resigned from his campaign. Multiple state officials, including Ohio Chief Justice Maureen O'Connor, former state representative and fellow gubernatorial candidate Connie Pillich, Dayton mayor and fellow gubernatorial candidate Nan Whaley, and Lieutenant Governor Mary Taylor, criticized O'Neill's comments, with Pillich and Whaley calling for him to resign from his position as associate justice. O'Neill initially called for his critics to "lighten up", saying that he intended to "elevate the discussion" on sexual assault. However, on November 19, he issued an apology for his remarks.

Professional life
O'Neill worked as a civil rights lawyer, small business owner, and union organizer. He is a registered nurse in the pediatric emergency department at Hillcrest Hospital in Mayfield Heights, Ohio.

References

External links

Bill O'Neill for Governor 2018
Campaign contributions at OpenSecrets.org

 

1947 births
Activists from Ohio
American civil rights lawyers
Cleveland–Marshall College of Law alumni
Judges of the Ohio District Courts of Appeals
Lawyers from Cleveland
Living people
Ohio Democrats
Justices of the Ohio Supreme Court
Ohio University alumni
Politicians from Cleveland
Cleveland Heights High School alumni